Chebulic acid is a phenolic compound isolated from the ripe fruits of Terminalia chebula.

This compound possesses an isomer, neochebulic acid.

Chebulic acid is a component of transformed ellagitannins such as chebulagic acid or chebulinic acid.

References 

Ellagitannins
Lactones